Schivereckia is a genus of plants in the family Brassicaceae.

Species
 Schivereckia doerfleri (Wettst.) Bornm.
 Schivereckia podolica (Besser) Andrz. ex DC.

References

 The Plant List entry
 ITIS report entry

Brassicaceae
Brassicaceae genera